Paul Allen Espinosa is an American politician and a Republican member of the West Virginia House of Delegates representing District 66 since January 12, 2013.

Education
Espinosa earned his bachelor's degree in Child Services from West Virginia Wesleyan College.

Elections
2012: Espinosa was unopposed for the May 8, 2012 Republican Primary, winning with 763 votes, and won the November 6, 2012 General election with 4,233 votes (59.6%) against Democratic nominee John Maxey.
2014: Espinosa was re-elected to the House with a victory over opponent Daniel Lutz of the Mountain Party, receiving 77.81% of the vote.
2016: Espinosa was once again re-elected, defeating Democratic challenger David Dinges.

References

External links
Official page at the West Virginia Legislature
Campaign site

Paul Espinosa at Ballotpedia
Paul Espinosa at OpenSecrets

21st-century American politicians
Hispanic and Latino American state legislators
Latino conservatism in the United States
Living people
People from Jefferson County, West Virginia
Place of birth missing (living people)
Republican Party members of the West Virginia House of Delegates
West Virginia University alumni
Year of birth missing (living people)